Snappy may refer to:

Computing
 Snappy (compression), a compression and decompression library
 Snappy (package manager), a software tool for the Ubuntu operating system

Other uses
 Snappy Sammy Smoot, a comic book character created and drawn by Skip Williamson
 Snappy The Little Crocodile, English name of the German children's cartoon Schnappi das kleine Krokodil
 Snappy Gifts, a multinational company which specializes in corporate gift giving

See also
 Snappy Dance Theater, a dance company in Cambridge, Massachusetts
 Snappy Snaps, a British photographic service
 Snappy Tomato Pizza, a privately held American pizza chain
 Snappii, a cloud-based, codeless platform for rapid mobile app development
 Snappies, a UK manufacturer of household products, including cling film
 Snap (disambiguation)